Paul William Hodes (born March 21, 1951) is an American lawyer, musician, and former U.S. Representative for , serving from 2007 to 2011. He is a member of the Democratic Party, and was New Hampshire's first Jewish representative.

Hodes was an unsuccessful candidate for the Senate seat being vacated by Judd Gregg in 2010, losing to former New Hampshire Attorney General Kelly Ayotte. He was succeeded in the House of Representatives by Charles Bass. 

After leaving Congress, Hodes was named as a board member of the Public Advisory Board of the New Hampshire Institute of Politics at Saint Anselm College. Hodes served on the boards of ADL, New England and the NJDC (National Jewish Democratic Council). In 2012, Hodes was nominated by President Barack Obama and confirmed by the US Senate to a position on the National Council on the Arts. He has subsequently worked as a green energy consultant with Shanti Energy, LLC and became Of Counsel at the law firm of Shaheen & Gordon, P.A. He also hosts radio programs on WKXL.

Early life, education and career
Hodes was born in New York City in 1951, the son of Florence R. (née Rosenberg) and Robert Bernard Hodes. His ancestors were Jewish immigrants from Russia, Poland, and Austria. Hodes graduated from The Collegiate School in 1968 and from Dartmouth College in 1972.  At Dartmouth, Hodes majored in French and Theater. In the fall of 1971, Hodes spent a semester studying theater at the National Theater Institute at the Eugene O'Neill Theater Center in Waterford, CT. In 1978, Hodes graduated from Boston College Law School.

Arts and entertainment career
Hodes began playing guitar at age 15. Throughout his adult life, he has been both a performer and active member of the arts and entertainment communities. After graduating from Dartmouth College, Hodes spent three years acting, writing, and working on radio shows. While in law school, he acted in the Boston Arts Group .  In the 1990s, Hodes was instrumental in the creation of the Capitol Center for the Arts in Concord, and previously served on the New Hampshire State Council on the Arts. In 2012, President Obama appointed Hodes to the National Council for the Arts which advises the Chair of the National Endowment for the Arts. In addition to re-invigorating his performing career, Hodes now manages musical acts including Hawk & Dove, Black Cosmic and Larksong trio through Big Round Music, LLC.

Hodes's wife Peggo is a children's musician with whom Hodes has recorded and performed as "Paul & Peggo." The couple won the 1996 Parent's Choice Honors Award for their album "Patchwork Quilt" and performed at the White House.

Law career
Hodes worked as an attorney with the New Hampshire Department of Justice from 1978 until 1980. He was an Assistant Attorney General from 1980 until 1982, when he left to serve as a special prosecutor. From 1983 until 1996 he was in private practice. He is now of Counsel to the firm of Shaheen & Gordon, P.A. in Concord, New Hampshire.

U.S. House of Representatives

Committee assignments
Committee on Financial Services
Subcommittee on Capital Markets, Insurance, and Government Sponsored Enterprises
Subcommittee on Financial Institutions and Consumer Credit
Committee on Oversight and Government Reform
Subcommittee on Government Management, Organization, and Procurement
Subcommittee on National Security and Foreign Affairs

Other membership and leadership positions
 American-Canadian Inter-Parliamentary Working Group
 President of the freshman class of 2006
 Board Member, Capitol Center for the Arts, 1990–1996, 2002–present
 Board Member, New Hampshire State Council on the Arts, 1998–present
 Board Member, New Hampshire Children's Alliance, 1998–2000
 Board Chair, Capitol Center for the Arts, 1990–1996

Political positions
In September 2008, Hodes voted against the Emergency Economic Stabilization Act of 2008, also known as "the financial bailout bill", which enacted the Troubled Asset Relief Program ("TARP").

He voted for the American Clean Energy and Security Act (commonly referred to as "cap and trade"), as well as the Patient Protection and Affordable Care Act.

Hodes was one of the first Democrats to demand that Representative Charlie Rangel surrender his Ways and Means chairmanship in the wake of the Ethics Committee finding that he violated House rules.

Political campaigns

2004 U.S. House campaign
Hodes ran unsuccessfully as a Democrat for United States House of Representatives in 2004 against incumbent Charles Bass in New Hampshire's 2nd congressional district.

2006 U.S. House campaign

In a rematch held on November 7, 2006, Hodes defeated Bass 53% to 46%.

2008 U.S. House campaign

In 2008, Hodes was re-elected winning with approximately 56% of the vote.

Hodes endorsed Barack Obama in the 2008 New Hampshire Democratic presidential primary.

2010 U.S. Senate campaign

Hodes was chosen as the Democratic nominee for the United States Senate seat held by outgoing Republican Senator Judd Gregg, who did not seek re-election. Hodes was defeated by Republican nominee Kelly Ayotte, the former New Hampshire Attorney General.  Libertarian Ken Blevens and Independent Chris Booth were also on the ballot.

2020 New Hampshire Senate campaign
Hodes ran as a Democrat for the New Hampshire Senate from the 15th district, but lost in the primary to Becky Whitley.

Post-electoral career
On February 16, 2019, Hodes joined the presidential campaign of Democratic candidate Marianne Williamson as a senior campaign advisor and New Hampshire state director.

Electoral history

!bgcolor=#CCCCCC|Year
!bgcolor=#CCCCCC|Office
!bgcolor=#CCCCCC|Election
!
!bgcolor=#CCCCCC |Subject
!bgcolor=#CCCCCC |Party
!bgcolor=#CCCCCC |Votes
!bgcolor=#CCCCCC |%
!
!bgcolor=#CCCCCC |Opponent
!bgcolor=#CCCCCC |Party
!bgcolor=#CCCCCC |Votes
!bgcolor=#CCCCCC |%
!
!bgcolor=#CCCCCC |Opponent
!bgcolor=#CCCCCC |Party
!bgcolor=#CCCCCC |Votes
!bgcolor=#CCCCCC |%
|-
|2004
|Congress, District 2
|General
||
|bgcolor=#DDEEFF|Paul Hodes
|bgcolor=#DDEEFF|Democratic
|bgcolor=#DDEEFF|125,280
|bgcolor=#DDEEFF|38.17
||
|bgcolor=#FFE8E8|Charles Bass
|bgcolor=#FFE8E8|Republican
|bgcolor=#FFE8E8|191,188
|bgcolor=#FFE8E8|58.25
||
|bgcolor=#99FFFF|Richard Kahn
|bgcolor=#99FFFF|Libertarian
|bgcolor=#99FFFF|11,311
|bgcolor=#99FFFF|3.45
|-
|2006
|Congress, District 2
|General
||
|bgcolor=#DDEEFF|Paul Hodes
|bgcolor=#DDEEFF|Democratic
|bgcolor=#DDEEFF|108,634
|bgcolor=#DDEEFF|52.71
||
|bgcolor=#FFE8E8|Charles Bass
|bgcolor=#FFE8E8|Republican
|bgcolor=#FFE8E8|94,012
|bgcolor=#FFE8E8|45.61
||
|bgcolor=#99FFFF|Ken Blevens
|bgcolor=#99FFFF|Libertarian
|bgcolor=#99FFFF|3,305
|bgcolor=#99FFFF|1.60
|-
|2008
|Congress, District 2
|General
||
|bgcolor=#DDEEFF|Paul Hodes
|bgcolor=#DDEEFF|Democratic
|bgcolor=#DDEEFF|188,332
|bgcolor=#DDEEFF|56.4
||
|bgcolor=#FFE8E8|Jennifer Horn
|bgcolor=#FFE8E8|Republican
|bgcolor=#FFE8E8|138,223
|bgcolor=#FFE8E8|41.4
||
|bgcolor=#99FFFF|Chester LaPointe
|bgcolor=#99FFFF|Libertarian
|bgcolor=#99FFFF|7,121
|bgcolor=#99FFFF|2.1
|-
|2010
|U.S. Senate
|General
||
|bgcolor=#DDEEFF|Paul Hodes
|bgcolor=#DDEEFF|Democratic
|bgcolor=#DDEEFF|166,538
|bgcolor=#DDEEFF|36.7
||
|bgcolor=#FFE8E8|Kelly Ayotte
|bgcolor=#FFE8E8|Republican
|bgcolor=#FFE8E8|272,703
|bgcolor=#FFE8E8|60.1
||
|bgcolor=#CCCCCC|Chris Booth
|bgcolor=#CCCCCC|Independent
|bgcolor=#CCCCCC|9,285
|bgcolor=#CCCCCC|2.1

Personal life
Hodes and his wife Peggo live in Concord, New Hampshire. They have two children, Max and Ariana.

See also
 List of Jewish members of the United States Congress

References

External links
 
Paul Hodes for US Senate official campaign site
 
Oral history interview through the Dartmouth Vietnam Project

|-

|-

1951 births
20th-century American lawyers
21st-century American Jews
21st-century American lawyers
21st-century American politicians
American children's musicians
American people of Austrian-Jewish descent
American people of Polish-Jewish descent
American people of Russian-Jewish descent
Boston College Law School alumni
Candidates in the 2010 United States elections
Candidates in the 2020 United States elections
Dartmouth College alumni
Democratic Party members of the United States House of Representatives from New Hampshire
Jewish members of the United States House of Representatives
Lawyers from New York City
Living people
Musicians from New Hampshire
Musicians from New York City
New Hampshire lawyers
Politicians from Concord, New Hampshire
Politicians from New York City